Sanday is a surname. People with that name include:

 John Sanday (born ), Fijian former rugby union player
 Kirwan Sanday (born 1991), Australian professional rugby union player
 William Sanday (disambiguation)

See also
 Sanday (disambiguation)